The 2023 Texas Longhorns volleyball team represented the University of Texas in the 2023 NCAA Division I women's volleyball season. The Texas Longhorns women's volleyball team, led by 23rd year head coach Jerritt Elliott, play their home games at Gregory Gymnasium. The Longhorns are members of the Big 12.

Texas is coming off a 28-1 season, winning the Big 12 Conference championship and the NCAA national championship.

Offseason

Outgoing departures

Outgoing Transfers

Incoming Transfers

Incoming recruits 

Source:

Roster

Coaches

Support Staff

Schedule

References

Texas Longhorns women's volleyball seasons
2023 in sports in Texas
2023 in American sports